Antonius L. Kimbrough (born September 17, 1970) is a former professional American football wide receiver who played for two seasons in the National Football League (NFL) for the Denver Broncos (1993–1994).

Kimbrough was born in Weir, Mississippi and played college football at Jackson State University. He was selected by the Denver Broncos in the seventh round of the 1993 NFL Draft at pick No. 182.

References

External links
 

1970 births
Living people
American football wide receivers
Denver Broncos players
Jackson State Tigers football players
People from Choctaw County, Mississippi
Players of American football from Mississippi